The 2016 UConn Huskies football team represented the University of Connecticut during the 2016 NCAA Division I FBS football season as a member of the East Division of the American Athletic Conference. They played their home games at Rentschler Field. They were led by third-year head coach Bob Diaco. They finished the season 3–9, 1–7 in American Athletic play to finish in a three way tie for fourth place in the East Division.

Schedule

Schedule Source:

Roster

Game summaries

Maine

Navy

Virginia

Syracuse

Houston

Cincinnati

South Florida

UCF

East Carolina

Temple

Boston College

Tulane

References

UConn
UConn Huskies football seasons
UConn Huskies football